The Punta Olimpica Tunnel is a vehicular transportation tunnel through high mountains, connecting the Callejón de Huaylas and Conchucos valleys of the Cordillera Blanca mountain range in Peru. The tunnel is intended to ease traffic on Route AN-107, one of the cross roads in the Ancash region linking the cities of Carhuaz, San Luis and Chacas a distance of 100 km.
Its drilling began on May 15, 2012, and ended on February 24, 2013. It opened in August 2013 in conjunction with Route AN-107.

Place Name
On August 9, 1936, the first shipment of young men responsible for exploring possible routes through the mountains via the road called Punta Olimpica in honor of the memorable feat of the Peruvian Football Team during the 1936 Berlin Olympics where they won 4–2 against Austria.

References

Tunnels in Peru
Buildings and structures in Ancash Region
Road tunnels